The 2019 Mid-American Conference men's basketball tournament was the postseason men's basketball tournament for the Mid-American Conference (MAC). Tournament first-round games were held on campus sites at the higher seed on March 11. The remaining rounds were held at Quicken Loans Arena, now known as Rocket Mortgage FieldHouse, in Cleveland, Ohio March 14–16, 2019. Buffalo defeated Bowling Green in the championship game to become the 2019 MAC tournament champions, and received the conference's automatic bid to the 2019 NCAA tournament.

Seeds
All 12 MAC teams participated in the tournament. Teams were seeded by record within the conference, with a tiebreaker system to seed teams with identical conference records. The top four teams received a bye to the quarterfinals.

Schedule

Bracket

* denotes overtime period

All-Tournament Team
Tournament MVP – Jeremy Harris, Buffalo

References

2019
Tournament
MAC men's basketball tournament
MAC men's basketball tournament
Basketball competitions in Cleveland
College sports tournaments in Ohio
2010s in Cleveland